Al-Qubayba may refer to:
Al-Qubayba, Hebron
Al-Qubayba, Ramle
Al-Qubeiba, Jerusalem